Rho Scorpii (ρ Scorpii, abbreviated Rho Sco, ρ Sco) is a double star in the constellation of Scorpius. It has an apparent visual magnitude of +3.87, which is bright enough to be seen with the naked eye. Based upon parallax measurements, it is located approximately 472 light years from the Sun. At that distance, the visual magnitude of the system is reduced by 0.07 due to extinction from interstellar dust. It is a member of the Upper Scorpius OB association.

It has two components, designated Rho Scorpii A and B. Rho Scorpii A is itself a single-lined spectroscopic binary whose components are designated Rho Scorpii Aa (formally named Iklil , traditionally the name for several neighboring stars) and Ab.

Nomenclature 

ρ Scorpii (Latinised to Rho Scorpii) is the system's Bayer designation. The designations of the three constituents as Rho Scorpii A and B, and those of A's components - Rho Scorpii Aa and Ab - derive from the convention used by the Washington Multiplicity Catalog (WMC) for multiple star systems, and adopted by the International Astronomical Union (IAU).

Rho Scorpii was likely part of the Arabic lunar mansion of Iklil (الإكليل al-ʼiklīl) "the crown (of the forehead)"), along with Beta, Delta, Pi and possibly Nu Scorpii.

In 2016, the IAU organized a Working Group on Star Names (WGSN) to catalog and standardize proper names for stars. The WGSN decided to attribute proper names to individual stars rather than entire multiple systems. It approved the name Iklil for the component Rho Scorpii Aa on 5 September 2017 and it is now so included in the List of IAU-approved Star Names.

Properties 

Rho Scorpii A displays the spectrum of blue-white B-type subgiant with a stellar classification of B2 IV. It has an estimated mass nearly 8 times that of the Sun's and shines with 3,432 times the Sun's luminosity. The two constituent stars orbit each other with a period of 4 days and an eccentricity of 0.27. 

Rho Scorpii B is a magnitude 12.80 visual companion that lies at an angular separation of 38.40 arcseconds along a position angle of 95°, as of the year 2000.

References

External links

Scorpii, Rho
Scorpius (constellation)
Binary stars
B-type subgiants
078104
5928
142669
Scorpii, 05
Upper Scorpius
Durchmusterung objects